Hernán Matias Arsenio Concha (born 31 March 1980) is a Swedish former professional footballer who played as a defender. He started off his career with Malmö FF in 2000 and then represented Djurgårdens IF and VfL Bochum before returning to Malmö FF in 2012. A full international between 2006 and 2008, he won eight caps for the Sweden national team.

Club career

Sweden
Concha was born in Malmö, where he began his career at the minor side Kulladals FF, before eventually signing for his home town giants, Malmö FF. In 2004, he moved to Stockholm and Djurgårdens IF after having been given playing time sparsely at Malmö FF. He quickly established himself as a starter for Djurgården and was part of their championship winning team of 2005, as well as Swedish cup golds 2004 and 2005. He played 76 games and scored two goals.

VfL Bochum
On 20 June 2007, it was announced that Concha would join the German football club VfL Bochum for the 2007–08 season. He signed a four-year deal with a team that had finished eighth the previous season. Concha left Bochum after the 2011–12 season.

Malmö FF
On 30 July 2012, Malmö FF announced that they had signed Concha for two and a half years. He returned to play with the number 23 shirt, symbolizing his age when he left Malmö for the first time. Concha played his first match for the club on 16 August 2012 when he played 64 minutes in a friendly against Italian side Lazio. He played two league matches for Malmö FF for the 2012 season. Concha took over the number 2 shirt for the 2013 season. He was given a lot of field time in the beginning of what turned out to be a title winning season for the club, however when Miiko Albornoz returned from suspension, Concha lost his place in the starting eleven for the rest of the season. He played a total of seven league matches for the club during the 2013 season. Concha received limited playing time also in the 2014 season, although he played eight matches in the league three matches in the clubs campaign for the 2014–15 UEFA Champions League. Concha announced his decision to retire from professional football after the 2014 season on 30 October 2014.

International career
Concha made his first appearance for the Sweden national football team on 23 January 2006 against Jordan. He made two appearances for Sweden during the UEFA Euro 2008 qualifying campaign but did not make the squad for the final tournament.

He won his eighth and final cap on 6 February 2008 in a friendly game against Turkey.

Career statistics

Club

International

Honours
Djurgårdens IF
 Allsvenskan: 2005
 Svenska Cupen: 2004, 2005

Malmö FF
 Allsvenskan: 2013, 2014
 Svenska Supercupen: 2013

References

External links

  (archive)
 
 Malmö FF profile 
 

1980 births
Living people
Footballers from Malmö
Association football defenders
Swedish footballers
Sweden international footballers
Malmö FF players
Djurgårdens IF Fotboll players
VfL Bochum players
VfL Bochum II players
Swedish people of Chilean descent
Sportspeople of Chilean descent
Swedish people of Spanish descent
Sportspeople of Spanish descent
Superettan players
Allsvenskan players
Bundesliga players
2. Bundesliga players
Swedish expatriate footballers
Swedish expatriate sportspeople in Germany
Expatriate footballers in Germany